This is a list of fossiliferous stratigraphic units in Zambia.



See also 
 Lists of fossiliferous stratigraphic units in Africa
 List of fossiliferous stratigraphic units in Angola
 List of fossiliferous stratigraphic units in Botswana
 List of fossiliferous stratigraphic units in the Democratic Republic of the Congo
 List of fossiliferous stratigraphic units in Malawi
 List of fossiliferous stratigraphic units in Mozambique
 List of fossiliferous stratigraphic units in Namibia
 List of fossiliferous stratigraphic units in Zimbabwe
 Geology of Zambia

References

Further reading 
 K. D. Angielczyk, J. S. Steyer, C. A. Sidor, R. H. H. Smith, R. L. Whatley and S. Tolan. 2014. Permian and Triassic Dicynodont (Therapsida: Anomodontia) Faunas of the Luangwa Basin, Zambia: Taxonomic Update and Implications for Dicynodont Biogeography and Biostratigraphy. In C. F. Kammerer, K. D. Angielczyk and J. Fröbisch (eds.), Early Evolutionary History of the Synapsida 93-138
 A. R. Drysdall and J. W. Kitching. 1963. A re-examination of the Karroo [sic] succession and fossil localities of part of the Upper Luangwa Valley. Memoir of the Geological Survey of Northern Rhodesia 1:1-62
 C. E. Gow. 2000. A Captorhinid with Multiple Tooth Rows from the Upper Permian of Zambia. Palaeontologia Africana 36:11-14
 W.S. Lacey. 1974. Some new African Gondwana plants. Birbal Sahni Institute of Paleobotany Special Publication 2:34-41
 M. S. Y. Lee, C. E. Gow, and J. W. Kitching. 1997. Anatomy and relationships of the pareiasaur Pareiasuchus nasicornis from the Upper Permian of Zambia. Palaeontology 40(2):307-335

 
Zambia
 
Fossiliferous stratigraphic units
Fossil